The evasive manoeuvre test (Swedish: Undanmanöverprov; colloquial: moose test or elk test; Swedish: Älgtest, German: Elchtest) is performed to determine how well a certain vehicle evades a suddenly appearing obstacle. This test has been standardized in ISO 3888-2.

Forms of the test have been performed in Sweden since the 1970s. The colloquial and internationally better-known name for the test was coined in 1997 by the German newspaper Süddeutsche Zeitung after the Swedish motor magazine  Teknikens Värld together with the TV-show Trafikmagasinet flipped a Mercedes-Benz A-Class in a test ostensibly made to measure the car's ability to avoid hitting a moose.

In reality, the test is constructed to simulate, for example, a reversing car or a child rushing out onto the road. This is because it is more likely that the moose will continue across the road than remain in place or turn back, making it more advisable to brake hard and try to slip behind the animal than to swerve in front of it.

Test specifications
The test is performed on a dry road surface. Traffic cones are set up in an S shape to simulate the obstacle, road, and road edges. The car to be tested has one belted person in each available seat and weights in the boot to achieve maximum load.

When the driver comes onto the track, they quickly swerve into the oncoming lane to  avoid the object and then immediately swerves back to avoid oncoming traffic. The test is repeated at an increased speeds until the car skids, knocks down cones, or spins around.

1997 Mercedes A-Class test

During an interview in Süddeutsche Zeitung, Collin tried to explain this test by the example of an evasive manoeuvre for a moose on the road. It was soon called Elchtest (moose test).

Mercedes initially denied the problem, but then took the step of recalling all units sold to date (2,600) and rebuilding 17,000 cars. and suspending sales for three months until the problem was solved by adding electronic stability control and modifying the suspension. The company spent DM 2.5 billion in developing the car, with a further DM 300 million to fix it.

Ongoing testing
Swedish automotive magazine Teknikens Värld tests "hundreds of cars every year". with the moose test. It publishes test results since 1983 on their website.

In July 2005, the Dacia Logan appeared initially to fail the test, but a later investigation concluded that excessive testing had worn the car's tyres to failure.

Some current vehicles, such as the 2021-present Mitsubishi Outlander and Volvo XC40 Recharge T4, still fail this test, although after the latest software upgrade the RAV4 now passes the test.

Current champion
The Citroën Xantia Activa V6 has held the record since 1999, beating cars such as the track-orientated 2008 Porsche 911 GT3 RS and the 2017 McLaren 675LT.

Actual moose collision testing
Although the moose test itself is based on the avoidance of hitting an obstruction in the road, testing is also carried out on actual collision with animals in the road.  Both Volvo and Saab have a tradition of taking moose crashes into account when building cars.

The Swedish National Road and Transport Research Institute has developed a moose crash test dummy called "Mooses". The dummy (which is made with similar weight, centre of gravity and dimensions to a live moose) is used to recreate realistic moose collisions.

Australian car manufacturers use crash test kangaroo dummies for similar reasons.

In a 2008 episode of Mythbusters, the urban legend that accelerating to hit a moose would cause less damage than braking was investigated and busted.  It was found that regardless of car type and speed, the damage to a vehicle was catastrophic in all cases.

See also
 Tilt test (vehicle safety test)

References

External links
Swedish National Road and Transport Research Institute  - Moose Crash Test Dummy
Moose test - list of the fastest and slowest cars

Automotive safety
Test